Epermenia bidentata is a moth in the family Epermeniidae. It was described by Alexey Diakonoff in 1955. It is found in New Guinea.

References

Epermeniidae
Moths described in 1955
Moths of New Guinea